Nicholas Mills Sr. (23 November 1781 – 13 September 1862) was a prominent businessman in Richmond, Virginia. He built a 13 mile tramway known as the Chesterfield Railroad Company(forerunner of Virginia's first railways) to connect the coal pits of Chesterfield County to the James River. A staunch Unionist, over his house flew the last Union flag in Richmond, April 1861.
He was at one time the owner of the Chesterfield Coal Pits and president of the Tredegar Iron Works. When he died in 1862 he is reported to have had $800,000 in gold (roughly $19,955,000 USD in 2017) stored in his vault, probably making him the wealthiest man in Virginia.

He was born in Hanover County, Virginia on November 23, 1781 and moved to Chesterfield County in 1803. 
On August 8, 1805, at the age of 22 or 23, Mills married Sarah Payne Ronald (1788–1857), the daughter of attorney Andrew Ronald and Sally Payne Ronald, a cousin of Dolley Madison. In 1811 Mills joined a firm involved in the Chesterfield County coal mining business called Bott and Cunliffe (named after Miles Bott and John Cunliffe and subsequently called Mills, Bott, and Cunliffe). In 1815, Miles Bott had to sell his share in the firm to Mills as a result of some financial difficulties.

In 1814, he served for three months and three days as Brigade Quartermaster in the 1st (Chamberlayne's) Brigade, Virginia Militia, during the War of 1812. Thereafter a staunch Unionist, over his house flew the last Union flag in Richmond, in April 1861.

His gravestone in Shockoe Hill Cemetery in Richmond reads thus "Paterfamilias - Nicholas Mills - Born in Hanover County Nov. 23rd 1781 - Died in the City of Richmond Sept. 13th 1862. Surrounded by a large family of children, grandchildren and faithful servants who would say much and yet lack words to express their irreplaceable loss. A sincere friend and neighbor and most useful citizen. The righteous man is taken from before the face of evil. God's will be done."

References

Further reading
"Nicholas Mills", The Quarterly of the Virginia Genealogical Society, 1965.
"Forerunner of Virginia's First Railway", Virginia Cavalcade Winter 1954.
Richmond Portraits in the Collection of the Valentine Museum pp. 132–3.
Houses of Richmond, pp. 43–5.

External links
Genealogies of Virginia Families

Businesspeople from Richmond, Virginia
1862 deaths
1781 births
19th-century American businesspeople